In 1910 Haakon VII serves his sixth year as King of Norway. On 1 February Wollert Konow takes over as Prime Minister after Gunnar Knudsen, who has held this position since 1908.

The Parliament passes a resolution about universal suffrage for women in municipal elections on 30 April. In Finnmark the Kirkenes–Bjørnevatn Line opens this year, and the Bøkfjord Lighthouse outside Kirkenes is completed. The Norwegian Institute of Technology is opened in Trondheim, as well as the accociated Student Society in Trondheim. The factory Norsk Gjærde- og Metaldukfabrik is founded. Also the Solør Line between Flisa and Elverum opens this year.

Several of the most difficult summits in Norway are first ascended in 1910. The climbing of Stetind in Nordland by Bryn, Rubenson and Schjelderup is followed by the same group's first ascent of Svolværgeita and Trakta in the Lofoten archipelago. There are now 278 newspapers in Norway. Among the new newspapers is Tidens Tegn, founded by Ola Thommessen, and the cultural magazine Kunst og Kultur is founded by Harry Fett and Haakon Shetelig.

In February anarchist writer Hans Jæger dies, and Nobel Laureate Bjørnstjerne Bjørnson dies in April. Politicians Stousland, Sunde, Ullmann and Segelcke die this year. In January later Prime Minister Trygve Bratteli is born, and later government minister Jens Haugland is born in April. The popular comedian Leif Juster is born in February this year. Folk musician Sigbjørn Bernhoft Osa is born in May, poet and actor Claes Gill is born in October, and Jens Book-Jenssen, the best-selling Norwegian artist in Norway in the 20th century, is born in November. Footballers and 1936 Olympic medalists Magnar Isaksen and Magdalon Monsen are born this year, as is illustrator Borghild Rud, professor of anatomy Alf Brodal and historian Ingrid Semmingsen.

Incumbents
Monarch – Haakon VII
Prime Minister – Gunnar Knudsen (until 1 February); Wollert Konow

Events

15 February – Norsk Gjærde- og Metaldukfabrik established.
30 April – The Parliament passes a resolution about universal suffrage for women in municipal elections.
29 May – Nationalforeningen mot tuberkulose founded.
13 July – The railway line Kirkenes–Bjørnevatn opened.
30 July – First ascent of Stetind, by Bryn, Rubenson and Schjelderup.
1 August – First ascent of Svolværgeita, by Bryn, Rubenson and Schjelderup.
3 August – First ascent of Trakta, by Bryn, Rubenson and Schjelderup.
15 September – Norwegian Institute of Technology (Norges Tekniske Høgskole, (NTH)) is opened in Trondheim.
4 December – The railway line from Flisa to Elverum opened.
Municipal and county elections are held throughout the country.
Bøkfjord Lighthouse is established at the mouth of Bøkfjorden, outside Kirkenes.

Full date unknown
Eidsvold TF founded
Hornindal IL founded
Mjøndalen IF founded
Stjørdal IL founded
IL Varden founded
Vestfossen IF founded

Popular culture

Sports

26 March – The sports club Grane SK (now: Bærum SK) is founded
29 May – The sports club Stenkjær FK founded
2 July – Norges Rigsforbund for Idræt is founded.

Music

Film

Literature
5 April – First issue of the newspaper Fjordenes Tidende.
5 May – First issue of the newspaper Tidens Tegn.

Full date unknown
The periodical Kunst og Kultur established.
The Olav Duun novel Nøkksjøliga (The Slope by Nøkk Lake) was published.
 The Knut Hamsund play Livet i Vold (In the Grip of Life), was published.

Notable births

10 January – Kitty Petrine Fredriksen, politician (died 2003)
11 January – Trygve Bratteli, twice Prime Minister of Norway (died 1984) 
14 January – Chris Bruusgaard, midwife (died 2000)
18 January – Jens Henrik Nordlie, military officer (died 1996) 
18 January – Oddmund Hoel, politician (died 1983).
22 January – Petter Mørch Koren, politician (died 2004)
25 January – Alf Brodal, professor of anatomy (died 1988) 
1 February (in Great Britain) – Birger Tvedt, physician (died 2002)
4 February – Asbjørn Lindhjem, politician (died 1994)
6 February – Gunnar Syverstad, resistance member (died 1945).
9 February – Rønnaug Alten, actress (died 2001)
14 February – Leif Juster, comedian, singer and actor (died 1995) 
15 February – Odd Granlund, media personality (died 1982)
18 February – Randi Monsen, illustrator (died 1997)
24 February – Parelius Hjalmar Bang Berntsen, politician (died 1995).
1 March – Torgeir Svendsen, politician (died 1981)
13 March – Sverre Nordby, football goalkeeper (died 1978)
15 March – Rolf Johannessen, football defender (died 1965)
20 March – Edmund Fjærvoll, politician (died 1975).
20 March – Borghild Rud, illustrator (died 1999) 
27 March – Ludvig Olai Botnen, politician (died 1987)
29 March – Ingrid Semmingsen, historian (died 1995) 
16 April – Jens Haugland, politician and Minister (died 1991) 
19 April – Magdalon Monsen, soccer player and Olympic bronze medallist (died 1953)
22 April – Lars L'Abée-Lund, police (died 1991)
27 April – Johan Melander, banker (died 1989)
28 April – Åsmund Sveen, writer (died 1963)
3 May – Sigbjørn Bernhoft Osa, folk musician, fiddler (died 1990) 
9 May – Lorentz Brinch, barrister, military officer, resistance member and politician (died 1953)
14 May – Sverre Holm, sociologist (died 1996)
15 May – Onar Onarheim, businessperson (died 1988)
28 May – Helga Dagsland, nurse educator (died 2003)
2 June – Per Hurum, sculptor (died 1989)
3 June – Christian Hartmann, composer (died 1985)
12 June – Finn Brudevold, odontologist (died 2006)
14 June – Erling Engan, politician (died 1982)
19 June – Lilli Gjerløw, archivist (died 1998)
21 June – Ole Martin Ystgaard, dairy leader (died 1970)
23 June – Arthur Mørch Hansson, diplomat (d. 1969)
26 June – Ole Otto Paus, general and diplomat (died 2003)
4 July – Erling Viksjø, architect (died 1971)
9 July – Torrey Mosvold, entrepreneur (died 1995) 
27 July – Per Fossum, alpine skier (died 2004)
27 July – Lorentz Nitter, physician (died 1997)
31 July – Svein Helling, sports shooter (died 1978).
7 August – Ingeborg Lyche, civil servant (died 1990)
11 August – Sigmund Selberg, mathematician (died 1994)
11 August – Arne Selberg, engineer (died 1989)
26 August – Finn Halse, writer (died 1980)
13 September – Olav Mosebekk, artist (died 2001)
30 September – Osvald Harjo, resistance member (died 1993)
7 October – Halfdan Gran Olsen, rower (died 1971)
12 October – Ferdinand Finne, artist (died 1999)
13 October – Claes Gill, author, poet and actor (died 1973)
13 October – Magnar Isaksen, footballer (died 1979)
24 October – Sverre Marstrander, archaeologist (died 1986)
26 October (in Madagascar) – Alex Johnson, clergyman (died 1989)
5 November – Eigil Helland-Hansen, travel agent (died 1997)
7 November – Bjarne Daniel Solli, politician (died 1989)
9 November – Bernhard Paus, orthopedic surgeon and Freemason Grand Master (died 1999).
12 November – Arvid Johansen, politician (died 1996)
14 November – Jens Book-Jenssen, singer, revue artist and theatre director (died 1999) 
21 November – Erik Braadland, diplomat and politician (died 1988)
1 December (in Copenhagen) – Per Palle Storm, sculptor (died 1994)
12 December – Aslaug Låstad Lygre, poet (died 1966)
13 December – Leif J. Wilhelmsen, philologist and politician (died 1976)
16 December – Ivar Johansen, bobsledder (died 1984)
18 December – Edvard Magnus Edvardsen, politician (died 2000)
21 December – Ole J. Malm, physician (died 2005)
26 December – Roar Hauglid, art historian (died 2001)
27 December – Karl Olsen, civil servant (died 1999) 
30 December – Erling Nilsen, boxer (died 1984)

Full date unknown
Ole Arntzen, Businessman and Milorg leader (died 1973)

Notable deaths

8 January – Christian Fürst, architect (born 1860)
8 February – Hans Jæger, writer, philosopher and anarchist political activist (born 1854).
24 February – John Anderson, Norwegian-American publisher (born 1836).
7 April – Theodor Nilsen Stousland, politician (born 1842).
26 April – Bjørnstjerne Bjørnson, writer and the 1903 Nobel Prize in Literature laureate (born 1832). 
20 May – Oscar Wergeland, painter (born 1844).
2 July (in Germany) – Elias Sunde, politician and Minister (born 1851).
19 July – Carl August Gulbranson, businessperson and politician (born 1831)
30 August – Viggo Ullmann, educator and politician (born 1848).
16 September John Utheim, teacher and politician (born 1847)
24 October – Toini Topelius, Finnish journalist who settled in Norway (born 1854) 
25 October – Lorentz Henrik Müller Segelcke, politician and Minister (born 1829). 
9 November – Hans Larsen Saakvitne, farmer, bailiff and politician (born 1839)
15 November – Emil Schreiner, philologist and educator (born 1831).
11 December – Lars Olsen Skrefsrud, missionary and language researcher in India (born 1840). 
19 December – Anders Daae, prison director (born 1838)
19 December U. V. Koren, Norwegian-American author, theologian and church leader (born 1826)
24 December Gudbrand Gregersen de Saág, Norwegian-Hungarian bridge engineer, architect and member of the Hungarian nobility (born 1824).
29 December – Henrik Thrap-Meyer, architect (born 1833).

Full date unknown
Axel Nicolai Herlofson, fraudster (born 1845)
Johan Vaaler, inventor (born 1866).

See also

References

External links

 
Norway
Norway